Zambia has 73 tribes spread across its ten provinces. This is a full list of the names of those 73 tribes arranged in alphabetical order:

 Ambo
 Aushi
 Bemba
 Bisa 
 Chewa 
 Chikunda
 Cishinga
 Chokwe
 Goba
 Ila
 Imilangu
 Ngoni
 Iwa
 Kabende
 Kaonde
 Kosa
 Kunda
 Kwandi
 Kwandu
 Kwangwa
 Lala
 Lamba
 Lambya
 Lenje
 Leya
 Lima
 Liyuwa
 Luyana
 Luano
 Luchazi
 Lumbu
 Lunda
 Lundwe
 Lungu
 Luunda
 Luvale
 Makoma
 Mambwe
 Mashasha
 Mashi
 Mijikenda
 Mbowe
 Mbukushu
 Mbumi
 Mbunda
 Mbwela
 Mukulu
 Mulonga
 Mwanga
 Namwanga
 Ndembu
 Ng'umbo
 Nkoya
 Nsenga
 Nyengo
 Nyika
 Sala
 Seba
 Senga
 Shanjo
 Shila
 Simaa
 Soli
 Subiya
 Swaka
 Swahili
 Tabwa
 Tambo
 Toka
 Tonga
 Totela
 Tumbuka
 Twa
 Unga
 Wandya
 Yombe

Tribes
Zambia